Oddvar Johannes Flæte (born 31 March 1944) is a Norwegian politician and civil servant.

He was born in Leikanger and grew up in Årdal, and graduated from the Norwegian School of Economics and Business Administration with a siviløkonom degree in 1971. He then worked in Høyanger and Vik works from 1971 to 1982, in ÅSV Foredling from 1982 to 1983, in Norwegian Petroleum Consultants from 1983 to 1987, in his own consultant firm from 1987 and then in Norwegian State Railways from 1992 to 1994 as a sub-director. He became County Governor of Sogn og Fjordane in 1994. He retired in 2011.

Flæte was a politician in his younger days. He was a deputy representative to the Parliament of Norway from Sogn og Fjordane during the term 1977–1981. He met during 8 days of parliamentary session. In 2010 he led the committee that delivered the Norwegian Official Report 2010: 10. The report was about society's adaptation to extreme weather.

References

1944 births
Living people
People from Leikanger
People from Årdal
Norwegian School of Economics alumni
Deputy members of the Storting
Labour Party (Norway) politicians
Sogn og Fjordane politicians
County governors of Norway